Carlton T. Spiller is an American poet, and lawyer.

Life
He graduated from Rutgers University, and from Seton Hall University with a J.D., in 1982.
He is a member of the board of directors of the Nuyorican Poets Cafe.

Awards
2006 American Book Award

Works

Anthologies

References

American male poets
Lawyers from New York City
Rutgers University alumni
Seton Hall University School of Law alumni
Year of birth missing (living people)
Living people
American Book Award winners